The Wrath of Olives operations room is an insurgent group that is active in Turkish-controlled areas of northern Syria.

History 
The group claims to have been founded following the Turkish invasion of Afrin, backed by an assortment of rebel groups. The group has been active since mid summer, 2018, and has carried out dozens of assassinations and bombings against Turkish-backed rebel forces. As the group has vowed to kill not just Turkish soldiers and allied Syrian militants, but all who cooperate with the pro-Turkish forces, it and another anti-Turkish insurgent faction (the "Afrin Falcons") have been described as "death squads". Middle East security analyst Nicholas A. Heras has argued that the Wrath of Olives operations room and the Afrin Falcons were formed as front organizations of the YPG, as the latter "is under pressure from the United States to disassociate itself from the most controversial assassinations in Afrin." Similarly, the pro-Syrian government al-Masdar News described the group as "YPG sleeper cell".

The Wrath of Olives operations room is among the most active insurgent groups in Afrin, along with the YPG and the Afrin Liberation Forces.

Tactics 
The group primarily wages a guerrilla campaign against the Turkish-backed forces in the countryside, using ambushes and bombings, often striking in the night. Unlike the YPG forces in Afrin, the Wrath of Olives operations room also carries out kidnappings, executions, and assassinations against Turkish-backed militants and civilians who collaborate with Turkish forces. For example, the group reportedly attempted several times to kill Hasan Şindi, a member of the Turkish-backed Afrin Council until he fled for Europe in August 2018.

References 

Insurgent groups in Asia
Organizations of the Syrian civil war
People's Protection Units
2018 establishments in Syria
Syrian Kurdish organizations
Front organizations